The 1985 Manila Beer Brewmasters season was the 2nd season of the franchise in the Philippine Basketball Association (PBA).

Transactions

Occurrences
Manila Beer’s first import in the Open Conference, Doug Harris, played seven games and was replaced by the comebacking Lew Brown, who is on his third PBA stint after playing previously with Great Taste in 1980 and Crispa in 1982.

Coach Loreto Carbonell was replaced by former U-Tex import Aaron James to be the team's new head coach starting the All-Filipino Conference. After three straight losses, James was given his walking papers and former Toyota coach Edgardo Ocampo takes over the coaching chores for the Brewmasters, Carbonell remains on the bench as the assistant coach.

On September 25, two-time MVP Ramon Fernandez was sent by Manila Beer to Tanduay Rhum Makers in exchange for one-time MVP Abet Guidaben in a blockbuster trade that took place in two and a half weeks after the start of the PBA Third Conference.

Notable dates
September 26: Abet Guidaben played his first game in Manila Beer uniform as the Brewmasters beat Magnolia, 93-91, for their fifth win in six games.  

October 17: Manila Beer turned back Northern Consolidated, 126-121, to make it as the first outright semifinalist in the Third Conference and with the best record after the double round eliminations with nine wins and three losses. 

November 17: In a match to decide the first finalist, Manila Beer trailed by nine points against Northern in the fourth period when they banked on an 18-2 salvo and posted a 98-91 lead with 30 seconds left in the ballgame. The Brewmasters enters the finals with a 99-93 win, sending NCC to a playoff match with Great Taste to determine the other finalist.

Finals stint
Heavily fancied at the start of the season, but struck out twice in their cracks for a round of four berth in the Open and All-Filipino Conferences and the crisis which ultimately resulted in the decision to trade Ramon Fernandez, Manila Beer came back in the Third Conference and pulled a hat trick as they will be playing in their second finals appearance. 

Manila Beer were swept in four games by the guest national team Northern Consolidated, coach by Ron Jacobs and with two naturalized players; Jeff Moore and Dennis Still. The Brewmasters lost in the four-game series by an average of 25.5 points and were routed in Games One and Four. The finals sweep by NCC was the first time in PBA history that it happen in a best-of-seven series.

Roster

Trades

Imports

References

Manila Beer Brewmasters seasons
Manila